Aleksey Vladimirovich Zatsepin (also Alexei Zatsepine, ; born May 5, 1984) is a Russian former swimmer, who specialized in freestyle and individual medley events. He is a five-time Russian champion in freestyle relays and individual medley (2000–2005). He also won a gold medal, as a member of the Russian team, in the 4×200 m freestyle relay (7:28.25) at the 2002 European Junior Swimming Championships in Linz, Austria.

Zatsepin qualified for two swimming events at the 2004 Summer Olympics in Athens, by clearing a FINA A-standard entry time of 2:02.15 (200 m individual medley) from the Russian Championships in Moscow. He also teamed up with Maksim Kuznetsov, Yevgeniy Natsvin, and Stepan Ganzey in the 4×200 m freestyle relay. Swimming the second leg, Zatsepin recorded a split of 1:51.75, and the Russian team finished the heats in eleventh overall with a final time of 7:23.97.

In his only individual event, 200 m individual medley, Zatsepine challenged seven other swimmers on the final heat of seven, including top medal favorite Michael Phelps of the United States. He rounded out the field to last place by nearly two seconds behind Australia's Adam Lucas in 2:04.11. Zatsepine failed to advance into the semifinals, as he placed twenty-ninth overall in the preliminaries.

Zatsepin retired from his sporting career in 2005 to serve as an assistant coach for the swimming team at Kama State Institute of Physical Culture in his home town Naberezhnye Chelny.

References

External links
Profile – Info Sport Russia 
Profile – Dukh Sporta 

1984 births
Living people
Russian male swimmers
Olympic swimmers of Russia
Swimmers at the 2004 Summer Olympics
Russian male freestyle swimmers
Male medley swimmers
People from Naberezhnye Chelny
Sportspeople from Tatarstan